Mokgenene is a village in Central District of Botswana. It is located 150 km north of the capital city Gaborone. The population was 513 in 2001 census.

References

Populated places in Central District (Botswana)
Villages in Botswana